Tikrikilla College, established in 1986, is a general degree college in Tikrikilla, in Meghalaya. It is affiliated with North Eastern Hill University. This college offers bachelor's degrees in arts.

References

Universities and colleges in Meghalaya
Colleges affiliated to North-Eastern Hill University
Educational institutions established in 1986
1986 establishments in Meghalaya